Mayabazaar 1995 is a 1995 Indian Tamil-language comedy horror film directed by Keyaar and produced by Meena Panchu Arunachalam. The film stars Ramki and Urvashi, with Suvarna Mathew, Visu, Vivek and Ajay Rathnam in supporting roles. It was released on 12 August 1995.

Plot 
Suji is the only daughter of billionaire Vishwanathan and plays pranks on the unsuspecting. One such prank she does is conducting an interview for choosing a personal secretary for her father, in which she chooses Ram as the secretary. Vishwanathan's friend Moorthy, manager Ajay, and Swarna want to take over Vishwanathan's property, so Moorthy sets up Raja to marry Suji. However, Suji marries Ram.

Vishwanathan suddenly dies of a heart attack, and Suji goes to Ooty but is killed by Ram, Moorthy, and Ajay. Suji becomes a ghost and decides to take revenge. Suji witnesses Mayamma, a lookalike who works a fake exorcist and asks her to act as herself. Suji witnesses that the real Ram is kidnapped by the villains and it is Raja whose face was changed as Ram through plastic surgery. All the baddies suspect that she might not be Suji and finds out that she is Mayamma. In the climax, Ram signs all the documents, brilliantly ties up his look-alike Raja, and gets him burnt. All three villains meet their fate: Swarna turns insane after seeing a skeleton, Suji possesses Moorthy's body and kills Ajay, and Moorthy is hanged.

Cast 

 Ramki as Ram/Raja
 Urvashi as Suji/Mayamma
 Suvarna Mathew as Swarna
 Visu as Vishwanathan (Suji's father)
 Vivek as Kuppu
 Kitty as Moorthy
 Ajay Rathnam as Ajay
 Chinni Jayanth
 Kamalesh as Raja
 Thyagu as Thangam
 Pandu as Police officer
 Junior Balaiah
 Swaminathan as Swaminathan

Soundtrack 
Music was composed by Ilaiyaraaja and lyrics were written by Vaali and Panchu Arunachalam.

Reception 
New Straits Times wrote that the film "has its own charm, definitely because of Urvasi's personal magic". Kalki criticised the film for lack of originality.

References

External links 
 

1990s comedy horror films
1990s Tamil-language films
1995 films
Films directed by Keyaar
Films scored by Ilaiyaraaja
Indian comedy horror films